Giovanni Lodovico Longo, also known as Gio. Luigi Lungo (fl. 1588), was an Italian mathematician.

Born in Piedmont, he became a citizen of Perugia and there a member of the Academy of the Senseless (Accademia degli Insensati), where he was nicknamed "the Concentrate" (il Concentrato).

Works

References 

16th-century births
16th-century Italian mathematicians